Telangana Praja Samithi or Telangana Peoples Convention was an Indian political party which fought for statehood for the Telangana region.

History
TPS was founded in 1969. The founding president of the party was Ananthula Madan Mohan. but later taken over by Marri Chenna Reddy who spearheaded the telangana agitation and eventually winning over 10 Lok Sabha seats in the 1971 elections. Later the members merged into the Congress party.

The party was revived again in 1983 with Vande Mataram Ramchander Rao, as the President, Pratap Kishore was the General Secretary. After the death of Vandemataram Ram Chander Rao, Gandhian Bhoopati Krishnamurthi (Telangana Gandhi) was elected president and led the party for nearly two decades up to his death in January 2015. After Bhoopati Krishnamoorthi Neera Kishore, was elected as President of Telangana Praja Samithi.₰₰₰

Movement
TPS organized a series of strikes and demonstrations throughout the Telangana region to push their demand for a separate state.  In June 1969 general strikes in Hyderabad organized by the TPS led to widespread violence as TPS supporters clashed with supporters of a unified Andhra state and with police.

Elections
In the 1971 Lok Sabha elections, TPS won 10 out of 11 seats in Telangana. However, in September 1971 TPS merged with Congress, and the Telangana agitations temporarily disappeared and P V Narsimha Rao was made the Chief Minister of Andhra Pradesh.

See also 
Indian National Congress breakaway parties

References

External links
http://epaper.thehansindia.com/c/30245124

Political parties in Telangana
1969 establishments in Andhra Pradesh
Political parties established in 1969
Indian National Congress breakaway groups